Saint Michael the Archangel and Saint Stanislaus the Bishop and Martyr Basilica, also known as Skałka, which means "a small rock" in Polish, is a small outcrop in Kraków atop of which a Pauline monastery is located, a place where the Bishop of Kraków saint Stanislaus of Szczepanów was slain by order of Polish king Bolesław II the Bold in 1079. This action resulted in the king's exile and the eventual canonization of the slain bishop.

History 

Located on the Vistula River south of Wawel, Skałka was part of the island city of Kazimierz until the nineteenth century, when the Old Vistula River was filled in.

The original church was built in the Romanesque style. King Casimir III replaced it with a Gothic church, and since 1472 that shrine has been in the possession of a monastic community of Pauline Fathers. In 1733-51 the church received a Baroque decor. It is one of the most famous Polish sanctuaries.

The Pauline "Church on the Rock" is primarily associated with the martyrdom of Saint Stanisław of Szczepanów. Each newly elected King of Poland made a pilgrimage to Skałka on the eve of his coronation as penance for the disgraceful action of his predecessor who had personally killed St. Stanisław.

Interior 

The crypt underneath the church serves as one of Poland's "National Panthéons" (alongside the Wawel Cathedral, St. John's Archcathedral and the Church of Saint Peter and Paul), a burial place for some of the most distinguished Poles, particularly those who lived in Kraków.

 Jan Długosz (1415–1480), diplomat and historian
 Wincenty Pol (1807–1872), poet, geographer and freedom fighter
 Lucjan Siemieński (1809–1877), poet, writer and freedom fighter
 Józef Ignacy Kraszewski (1812–1887), writer and historian
 Teofil Lenartowicz (1822–1893), poet and sculptor
 Adam Asnyk (1838–1897), poet, playwright and freedom fighter
 Henryk Siemiradzki  (1843–1902), painter
 Stanisław Wyspiański (1869–1907) poet, playwright and painter
 Jacek Malczewski (1854–1929), painter
 Karol Szymanowski (1882–1937), composer and pianist
 Ludwik Solski (1855–1954), theatre actor and director
 Tadeusz Banachiewicz (1882–1954), astronomer and mathematician
 Czesław Miłosz (1911–2004), poet and essayist, Nobel Prize recipient

Exterior 

Outside the church is the Well of Saint Stanislaus.  According to legend, this well is where King Bolesław discarded the bishop's dismembered body, which then miraculously reassembled.  Water from the well is dispensed from a fountain for pilgrims to drink.

In 2008, the Pauline fathers added the open-air Altar of the Three Millennia, with statues representing seven important people in Polish history.

 Augustyn Kordecki (1603–1673), prior of Jasna Góra Monastery during the Siege of Jasna Góra
 Jadwiga of Poland (1374-1399), first female monarch of the Kingdom of Poland
 Adalbert of Prague (956-997), bishop of Prague and martyr
 Stanislaus of Szczepanów (1030-1079), bishop of Kraków and martyr
 Pope John Paul II (1920-2005), archbishop of Kraków, elected Pope in 1978 
 Faustina Kowalska (1905-1938), nun whose mystical revelations inspired the Divine Mercy devotion
  Jan Kanty (1390-1473), priest and professor of philosophy and theology at the Kraków Academy

Six of these people (the exception being Kordecki) are venerated as saints in the Catholic Church.

See also
Wawel Cathedral
Saints Peter and Paul's Church in Kraków

External links
  Official site
 Entry at Krakow Info
 'Sowa' Licensed Krakow Guides
 Panorama of the Altar of the Three Millennia

References 

Christian holy places
Roman Catholic churches in Kraków
Basilica churches in Poland
Rococo architecture in Poland
18th-century Roman Catholic church buildings in Poland